Yasmine Boudjenah (born 21 December 1970), is a French politician, who, from 1999 until 2004, was a Member of the European Parliament representing France. She was elected representing the Communist Party.

Parliamentary service
Member, Committee on Development and Cooperation
Member, Delegation for relations with the Maghreb countries and the Arab Maghreb Union

References

1970 births
Living people
Politicians from Paris
French Communist Party MEPs
MEPs for France 1999–2004
20th-century women MEPs for France
21st-century women MEPs for France

French people of Algerian descent